Connecticut's 77th House of Representatives district elects one member of the Connecticut House of Representatives. It encompasses parts of Bristol and has been represented by Republican Cara Pavalock-D'Amato since 2015.

Recent elections

2020

2018

2016

2014

2012

References

77